The Journal of Prosthetic Dentistry is a monthly peer-reviewed medical journal covering prosthodontics and restorative dentistry. It is published by Elsevier on behalf of the Editorial Council for the Journal of Prosthetic Dentistry and the editor-in-chief is Stephen F. Rosenstiel (Ohio State University). It is the official publication for 24 prosthodontic organisations.

Abstracting and indexing 
The journal is abstracted and indexed in Index Medicus/MEDLINE/PubMed and CINAHL. According to the Journal Citation Reports, the journal has a 2021 impact factor of 4.148.

References

External links
 

Dentistry journals
Surgery journals
Elsevier academic journals
English-language journals
Monthly journals
Publications established in 1951